The Indian union-territory of Ladakh currently has only one airport meant for civilian flights, the Kushok Bakula Rimpochee Airport in Leh. The airport at Leh is jointly operated by the Airports Authority of India and the Indian Air Force. There is another airport at Kargil, but it is currently used for defence purposes only. Several airstrips have been built by the Indian Air Force in Ladakh in the past to improve connectivity and for security purposes. Since the start of 2020–2022 China–India skirmishes, the Government of India has pushed for improving the existing aviation infrastructure across Ladakh.

The new terminal at Kushok Bakula Rimpochee Airport is proposed to be opened in December 2022. There have been proposals to enable the Kargil Airport and Thoise Airport for handling commercial flights but there has not been significant progress.

List
The list includes the airports in Ladakh with their respective ICAO and IATA codes.

References

Ladakh
Buildings and structures in Ladakh